Staff ace Burleigh Grimes won 22 games, but the 1921 Brooklyn Robins fell into 5th place.

Offseason 
 December 15, 1920: Rube Marquard was traded by the Robins to the Cincinnati Reds for Dutch Ruether.

Regular season

Season standings

Record vs. opponents

Notable transactions 
 June 18, 1921: Jeff Pfeffer was traded by the Robins to the St. Louis Cardinals for Ferdie Schupp and Hal Janvrin.
 August 31, 1921: Eddie Eayrs was purchased by the Robins from the Boston Braves.

Roster

Player stats

Batting

Starters by position 
Note: Pos = Position; G = Games played; AB = At bats; H = Hits; Avg. = Batting average; HR = Home runs; RBI = Runs batted in

Other batters 
Note: G = Games played; AB = At bats; H = Hits; Avg. = Batting average; HR = Home runs; RBI = Runs batted in

Pitching

Starting pitchers 
Note: G = Games pitched; IP = Innings pitched; W = Wins; L = Losses; ERA = Earned run average; SO = Strikeouts

Other pitchers 
Note: G = Games pitched; IP = Innings pitched; W = Wins; L = Losses; ERA = Earned run average; SO = Strikeouts

Relief pitchers 
Note: G = Games pitched; W = Wins; L = Losses; SV = Saves; ERA = Earned run average; SO = Strikeouts

References

External links
Baseball-Reference season page
Baseball Almanac season page
1921 Brooklyn Robins uniform
Brooklyn Dodgers reference site
Acme Dodgers page 
Retrosheet

Los Angeles Dodgers seasons
Brooklyn Robins season
Brooklyn Robins season
1920s in Brooklyn
Flatbush, Brooklyn